JCM may refer to:

Japan Collection of Microorganisms
James Clerk Maxwell
John Cougar Mellencamp
Journal of Clinical Microbiology
Journal of Communications
AGM-169 Joint Common Missile
Jewish Children's Museum
Jackson Central-Merry High School, a public high school in Jackson, Tennessee
JunoCam, a camera on a planned space probe to the planet Jupiter
Joint Council of Municipalities
Jaynes-Cummings model